Leucanopsis maccessoya is a moth of the family Erebidae. It was described by William Schaus in 1933. It is found in Brazil.

References

maccessoya
Moths described in 1933